Inside Schwartz is an American sitcom television series created by Stephen Engel, that aired on NBC from September 27, 2001, until January 3, 2002, starring Breckin Meyer as the title character. The show was produced by 20th Century Fox Television and NBC Studios and first aired on NBC on Thursday Night at 8:30 EST.

Plot
After losing a long-time girlfriend, minor-league sportscaster Adam Schwartz's (Meyer) dating life is illustrated by sports highlights (as presented by Fox Sports Net) in which various pro sports personalities appear. For instance, when Adam's date reveals that she has three children a referee appears and makes the call "Too many players on the field".

Cast

Breckin Meyer as Adam Schwartz
Miriam Shor as Julie Hermann
Bryan Callen as David Cobert
Jennifer Irwin as Emily Cobert
Richard Kline as Gene Schwartz
Dondré T. Whitfield as William Morris (episodes 2–4, 9)
Maggie Lawson as Eve Morris (episodes 7–8; recurring, previously)

Recurring
Van Earl Wright as Himself
Kevin Frazier as Himself

Episodes

Cancellation
The series followed Friends, which was in its 8th and highest-rated season. Inside Schwartz debuted with 22.5 million viewers. Of the 9 episodes to air, 5 followed new episodes of Friends. But despite having an average household rating of 9.8 and being ranked 16th among all programs in the ratings, Inside Schwartz was cancelled as network executives believed that the valuable time slot could get higher ratings.

The time slot was filled with a new series, Leap of Faith, which aired for six episodes, and finally NBC simply aired repeat episodes of Friends which had higher ratings than either Inside Schwartz or Leap of Faith.

Legacy

Prominent television writer and producer Dan Harmon cited the premier of Inside Schwartz as a watershed moment in the history of television and the end of an era for traditional network programming.

See also
 Bananas
 Pete versus Life

References

External links 
 

2001 American television series debuts
2002 American television series endings
2000s American sitcoms
English-language television shows
Television series by Universal Television
Television series by 20th Century Fox Television
NBC original programming